Anjeva Gara is a rural commune in Analamanga Region, in the  Central Highlands of Madagascar. It belongs to the district of Antananarivo Avaradrano and its populations numbers to 8,278 in 2018.

Economy
10km east of Anjeva Gara on the Ikopa River is found the Antelomita Hydroelectric Power Station.
It has a capacity of 8.4 MW.

References

Monographie Anjeva Gara

Populated places in Analamanga